The Italian barbel (Barbus plebejus) is a species of freshwater fish in the  family Cyprinidae, nearly related to the common barbel Barbus barbus. The name barbel derived from the Latin barba, meaning beard, a reference to the two pairs of barbels,  a longer pair pointing forwards and slightly down positioned, on the side of the mouth.

Description
Barbus plebejus can reach a maximum length of 70 cm in males and a maximum weight of 6 kilograms. Usually, it is much smaller. It has a long and slender body, with a mouth equipped with characteristic four barbels (hence the common and genus names). It has greenish back with black dots, sides finely dotted, whitish belly, paired fins tinged with grey and a slightly thorny dorsal ray. Lower lip has a median lobe.

Distribution
The species is found in Croatia, Italy, Slovenia and Switzerland.

Habitat
Like the common barbel, these long-lived fishes have their natural habitats in running waters of rivers and rarely freshwater lakes. They inhabit the water just above the bottom (benthopelagic), feeding on benthic invertebrates, small fish and algae. They also migrate within freshwater (potamodromous), for spawning purposes. It is not considered a threatened species by the IUCN.

References

 Helfman, G., B. Collette i D. Facey: The diversity of fishes. Blackwell Science, Malden, Massachusetts, United States, 1997.
 Moyle, P. i J. Cech.: Fishes: An Introduction to Ichthyology, 4th ed., Upper Saddle River, New Jersey (United States): Prentice-Hall. Any 2000.
 Nelson, J.: Fishes of the World, 3rd. Ed. New York (United States): John Wiley and Sons. Any 1994.
 Wheeler, A.: The World Encyclopedia of Fishes, 2nd ed., London: Macdonald. Any 1985.
Mitochondrial phylogeny and taxonomic revision of Italian and Slovenian fluvio-lacustrine barbels, Barbus sp. (Cypriniformes, Cyprinidae). (n.d.). https://bmczool.biomedcentral.com/articles/10.1186/s40850-021-00073

External links

 Fishbase

Barbus
Freshwater fish of Europe
Fish described in 1839
Taxa named by Charles Lucien Bonaparte
Taxonomy articles created by Polbot